Leslie Welch (29 December 1907 – 8 February 1980) was a British radio and television entertainer known as the Memory Man.

Early life and career 
Leslie was born in Edmonton, London. Educated at the Latymer School where he was an excellent student who was addicted to sport and spent much of his free time studying sports almanacks such as Wisden and Ruff's Guide to the Turf.

On leaving school he was employed at the Royal Small Arms Factory, Enfield Lock in the Accounts Department.

During the Second World War he served with the Eighth Army in the Western Desert and it was here that his encyclopaedic knowledge of sport was recognised and was signed up by ENSA.

After demob he became popular on radio shows such as Variety Playhouse and In Town Tonight, he was also a regular on TV's Kaleidoscope and made many London Palladium performances. By 1952, he hosted Beat the Memory Man broadcast on Radio Luxembourg.

For his act he simply stood on the stage and talked sport before accepting 'challenges' from the audience, who would call out all kinds of questions which he would normally answer immediately and adding a few more facts and figures.

Later life 
Welch never considered himself special and he once said:

Unfortunately, he found the rigours of his career too great and in 1963 turned his back on the stage and became a civil servant and settled in Ruislip, Middlesex where he later died aged 72.

References

External links 
 

1907 births
1980 deaths
People from Edmonton, London
British entertainers
British radio personalities
British television personalities
People educated at The Latymer School